Sound is a weekly music, entertainment and chat show broadcast by BBC Two as part of the BBC Switch teen strand.  It was presented by BBC Radio 1 DJs Annie Mac and Nick Grimshaw.

The show first aired in 2007 and the first series featured various bands performing out on location.  A second series returned in September 2008; however, the show had been markedly revamped.  It now came from a studio apartment location and featured more guest chat and less performances.  It introduced new segments like Nick's desk item 'The Grimshaw Files' - a comedic look at the world of music and entertainment, and Annie's New Music Forecast - in which Annie showcased three new tracks to check out that week.

The second series ran until December 2008.  A third series ran from January to June 2009, and added comedian Holly Walsh to the presenting team.

The theme song of the show is "Leap of Faith" by Hadouken!.

References

External links

BBC Television shows